Adolph Lawrence (March 24, 1969 – March 25, 2019) was a Liberian politician who was a member of the House of Representatives between 2012 and his death in 2019. Lawrence was killed in a motor accident. He was married to Grand Bassa County Senator Nyonblee Karnga-Lawrence. In the legislature, Lawerence represented the District 15 of Montserrado County. He was a member of the Congress for Democratic Change.

References

1969 births
2019 deaths
Members of the House of Representatives of Liberia
Road incident deaths in Liberia
Congress for Democratic Change politicians
Place of birth missing
21st-century Liberian politicians